Backoo is an unincorporated community in Advance Township in North Dakota's Pembina County, United States, located approximately five miles northwest of Cavalier. It was established in 1887 as a townsite along the Great Northern Railroad.

History
Backoo was a town of roughly 50 people, and was one of the more prominent communities in the township. The post office was established September 26, 1887, and was in continuous operation for more than 100 years, closing October 11, 1988. The post office was assigned the ZIP code of 58215. Mail service is now handled through Cavalier.

John Mountain, one of its first settlers, is reported to have named the town after the Barcoo River in his home country of Australia. Other sources credit the origin of the name to Baku, a city in Azerbaijan on the Caspian Sea.

References

Australian American
Unincorporated communities in Pembina County, North Dakota
Unincorporated communities in North Dakota
Populated places established in 1887
1887 establishments in Dakota Territory